Acmana is a genus of moths of the family Erebidae. The genus was described by Schaus in 1916.

Species
Acmana apicioides Schaus, 1916 Brazil (Paraná)
Acmana moeonalis (Walker, 1859) Brazil
Acmana paulina Schaus, 1916 Brazil (Rio de Janeiro)

References

Hypeninae
Noctuoidea genera